Better Than Me may refer to:

 "Better Than Me", a song by Doja Cat from Hot Pink
 "Better Than Me" (Hinder song)
 "Better Than Me", a song by Metro Station from Savior
 "Better Than Me" (Terry Dexter song)
 "Better Than Me", a song by The Brobecks from Violent Things